SS C. W. Post was a Liberty ship built in the United States during World War II. She was named after C. W. Post, an American inventor, breakfast cereal and foods manufacturer and a pioneer in the prepared-food industry. He was the founder of what is now Post Consumer Brands.

Construction
C. W. Post was laid down on 6 October 1944, under a Maritime Commission (MARCOM) contract, MC hull 2504, by the St. Johns River Shipbuilding Company, Jacksonville, Florida; she was sponsored by Marjorie Merriweather Post, the daughter of the namesake, and was launched on 8 November 1944.

History
She was allocated to the United States Navigation Company on 17 November 1944. On 4 March 1948, she was laid up in the James River Reserve Fleet, Lee Hall, Virginia. On 31 May 1954, she was withdrawn from the fleet to be loaded with grain under the "Grain Program 1954"; she returned loaded on 8 June 1954. On 18 May 1956, she was withdrawn to be unloaded, she returned reloaded with grain on 25 June 1956. On 20 June 1957, she was withdrawn from the fleet to be unloaded, she returned empty on 1 July 1957. On 3 July 1958, she was withdrawn from the fleet to be loaded with grain under the "Grain Program 1958", she returned loaded on 11 July 1958. On 28 January 1960, she was withdrawn to be unloaded; she returned empty on 2 February 1960. On 24 October 1960, she was withdrawn from the fleet to be loaded with grain under the "Grain Program 1960"; she returned loaded on 6 November 1960. On 4 May 1963, she was withdrawn to be unloaded; she returned empty on 7 May 1963. She was sold for scrapping, on 21 September 1971, to Eckhardt & Co., GMBH., for $70,070. She was removed from the fleet on 15 October 1971.

References

Bibliography

 
 
 
 

 

Liberty ships
Ships built in Jacksonville, Florida
1944 ships
James River Reserve Fleet
James River Reserve Fleet Grain Program